Roger E. Reuse (born August 9, 1966) is an American professional sports car racing and stock car racing driver. He has raced in the Trans-Am Series, NASCAR Xfinity Series and NASCAR Camping World Truck Series.

In Trans-Am, he and his brother Bobby Reuse operate the GT2 team Reuse Brothers Racing.

Racing career

Xfinity Series

In 2014, Reuse and his brother Bobby made their NASCAR debut. Reuse drove the No. 74 Chevrolet for Mike Harmon Racing at Watkins Glen. He started 38th and finished 30th. In his next and final race of the season at Mid-Ohio, Reuse started and finished 39th in the No. 77 Dodge due to transmission issues.

In 2015, Reuse returned to Mike Harmon Racing in the Xfinity Series for the Road America race. He started 37th and finished 31st.

Reuse returned to the team for the 2016 season. He drove the No. 74 Dodge in the Mid-Ohio race, starting 39th and finishing 33rd.

Truck Series
In 2018, Reuse drove No. 97 Chevrolet Silverado for Jordan Anderson Racing using JJL Motorsports' owners points at Canada in his Truck Series debut. He started 24th and finished 27th due to a vibration.

In 2019, Reuse returned once again to Jordan Anderson Racing at Canada's race but now driving the No. 04 Chevrolet Silverado using Roper Racing's owners points. He started 26th and finished 25th. Bobby drove the No. 56 Chevrolet Silverado for the same team in the same race.

Reuse made his Truck return in August 2020 for the Sunoco 159 at the Daytona International Speedway road course, driving the No. 49 CMI Motorsports truck. After the No. 49 was withdrawn from the 2021 race, Reuse and his brother rejoined Jordan Anderson Racing for a part-time schedule in the No. 3.

Personal life
The Reuses own Alabama Controls, Inc., an energy and security company founded by their father in 1975.

Motorsports career results

NASCAR
(key) (Bold – Pole position awarded by qualifying time. Italics – Pole position earned by points standings or practice time. * – Most laps led.)

Xfinity Series

Camping World Truck Series

 Season still in progress
 Ineligible for series points

References

External links

 

Living people
1966 births
NASCAR drivers
Racing drivers from Alabama